The Coraddi is the art and literature magazine of the University of North Carolina at Greensboro. It was first published on March 15, 1897, under the name State Normal Magazine to provide news in relation to the State Normal and Industrial College, the former name of the University of North Carolina at Greensboro. In 1919, both its name and its content were changed. The magazine was renamed The Coraddi in honor of its founders: the Cornelian, Adelphian, and Dikeian literary societies. During the relaunch, its purpose expanded to include both art and literature.

History 
Founded on March 15, 1897, The Coraddi is the longest running publication produced by the University of North Carolina at Greensboro.
In 2017, The Coraddi moved itself to an online platform. It now publishes multimedia art and video as well as literature and  visual arts.

Circulation 
The Coraddi is published biannually, producing one edition each April and November. 
The Coraddi accepts submissions from current students, alumni, and faculty/staff, as long as the submission is a maximum of 15 pages.

Awards 
The Coraddi has received The Printing Industries of America's Certificate of Merit in 1983 and 1987.

Artwork 
The Coraddi accepts a variety of art mediums including, but not limited to, painting, sculptures, digital works, and more.

Literature 
The Coraddi also accepts a variety of literature

"Old Wives Tale" Rebecca White

"Grand Stands" Emily Lampkin

References

External links
The Coraddi Online

1897 establishments in North Carolina
Biannual magazines published in the United States
Literary magazines published in the United States
Magazines established in 1897
Magazines published in North Carolina
University of North Carolina at Greensboro